Club Deportivo Olímpico de León is a Spanish women's football club from León currently playing in Segunda División.

History

The club was founded as Puente Castro FC, before taking the name of León Fútbol Femenino in 1991. Puente Castro was one of the nine founding teams of the Liga Nacional de Fútbol Femenino in 1988.

The club enjoyed its best results in the following years, reaching the national cup's semifinals in 1990 and 1993 and playing in the División de Honor in 1989 — 1991 and 1995. In subsequent years the team played in the second tier, which served as the top category from 1997 to 2001 after the División de Honor was disbanded. León's best results in the second tier were 3rd positions in 2005 and 2010. It was briefly relegated to the third tier in 2006, 2008 ans 2013.

After spending four years in Regional, León FF promoted again to Segunda División in 2017. In May 2018, León FF was absorbed by CD Olímpico de León, becoming its women's football section.

Season to season

As Puente Castro

As León FF

As Olímpico de León

Former internacionals
  Celsa García
  Mercedes González

References

Women's football clubs in Spain
Football clubs in Castile and León
Sport in León, Spain